Steep Island may refer to:

Steep Island, Australia, an island in Bass Strait between northwest Tasmania and King Island
Steep Island, Hong Kong, an island off the eastern coast of Sai Kung Peninsula
Guishan Island (Yilan), an island off the northeastern coast of Yilan, Taiwan, also known as Steep Island